Khawla S. Al-Kuraya is a Saudi physician and cancer specialist. She is a professor of pathology and directs the King Fahad National Center for Children's Cancer and Research.

Al-Kuraya was born in the Al Jawf Region of Saudi Arabia. She was admitted to King Saud University in Riyadh and earned her MD in general surgery and medicine. She completed her residency in clinical pathology in Washington D.C. at Georgetown University Hospital. She then completed a fellowship in molecular diagnostics and hematopathology at the National Cancer Institute.

Al-Kuraya first identified the FOSM1 gene, which prompts the human body to form cancer cells.

For her cancer research Al-Kuraya was awarded the Order of Abdulaziz al Saud in 2010. She was the first Saudi woman to receive the award. Saudi newspapers and television depicted King Abdullah shaking her hand and placing the medal around her neck. The public display of proximity to an unrelated woman was unprecedented at the time.

She was among 30 women who in 2013 were appointed by King Abdullah to the Consultative Assembly of Saudi Arabia, an advisory body that proposes laws.

References

Living people
Cancer researchers
King Saud University alumni
Saudi Arabian pathologists
Saudi Arabian women medical doctors
Year of birth missing (living people)